Stuani is an Italian surname. Notable people with the surname include:

 Cristhian Stuani (born 1986), Uruguayan footballer
 Giampaolo Stuani (born 1966), Italian pianist

Italian-language surnames